The  Archdeacon of Sumner  is the title of a senior post  that has been used at certain times within the Anglican Diocese of Christchurch, part of the Anglican Church in Aotearoa, New Zealand and Polynesia.

References

Christianity in Christchurch
Archdeacons of Sumner